The Dolderbahn (Db or DBZ) is a   long rack railway in the Swiss city of Zürich. The line is in Zürich's Hottingen and Fluntern suburbs on the south slope of the Adlisberg mountain. The upper terminus at Bergstation Dolderbahn is adjacent to the Dolder Grand Hotel and the Dolder recreation area. Two intermediate stations, at Titlisstrasse and Waldhaus Dolder, are also served.

The line is owned by the Dolderbahn-Betriebs AG, which is itself 50% owned by the city of Zürich, and is operated on their behalf by the municipal transport operator Verkehrsbetriebe Zürich. The line was opened in 1895 as a funicular railway, and converted to rack operation in 1973. Because of this history, it is still sometimes erroneously referred to as a funicular or cable car.

History 
The first proposal for the line was in 1890, when Heinrich Hürlimann purchased land in the area, although  his first proposals fell through. In 1893, the Dolderbahn-Aktiengesellschaft company was formed to build the line, with construction commencing the following year. The line was built as a funicular railway and opened in 1895. The upper terminus of the funicular was roughly on the site of the uppermost of the current line's two intermediate stations.

Following the opening of the line, a restaurant was built at the line's upper terminus; this became the Dolder Waldhaus Hotel in 1906. In 1899, the Dolder Grand Hotel was built uphill from the upper terminus of the funicular, and was linked to the funicular by a short electric tramway, with a single tramcar. The line was built to the same  gauge as Zürich's other electric tramways, but was never connected to any of them. In 1922 the tramcar was rebuilt to allow one-man operation, but in 1930 it was replaced by a bus.

In 1971 the concession of the original company expired, and a new company, the Dolderbahn-Betriebs-AG, was created to convert the line to rack operation. At the same time the line was extended at its upper end to directly serve the Dolder Grand Hotel, thus replacing the bus that had in turn replaced the tram. The new line opened in 1973, and in 1999 the Verkehrsbetriebe Zürich took over operation of the line. In 2004, the line was completely renovated along with the four stations and two railcars. As part of this rebuild, a new design of flexible rack turnout was installed at the passing point.

Operation 
It is built to metre gauge ( gauge), uses the Strub rack system and is single track with a single intermediate passing loop. The passing loop is situated between Titlisstrasse and Waldhaus Dolder stations and features flexible rack turnouts at both ends.

The line is operated by a pair of four-wheel rack railcars, each of which can carry 100 passengers. The cars are electrically driven off a 600 volt direct current overhead supply and are propelled by a cog-wheel attached to the downhill of the vehicles two axles. They were built by the Swiss Locomotive and Machine Works, with electrical equipment from Brown, Boveri & Cie, in 1972. In line with its funicular origins, the line has no depot and no track connection to any other line. The cars are stabled and maintained in the terminal stations.

The line runs from 06.20 until 23.30 every day, with services running every 10, 15 or 20 minutes depending on the time of day. The journey time is approximately 5 minutes. The standard Zürcher Verkehrsverbund zonal fare tariffs apply, with the whole of the line being within fare zone 110 (Zürich city, formerly zone 10).

Future 
In June 2021, the Verkehrsbetriebe Zürich ordered two new railcars from Stadler Rail at Bussnang to replace the existing pair of cars used on the line. The new railcars are scheduled to be delivered in mid-2024 and will cost SFr10.6m.

See also 
 List of funicular railways
 List of funiculars in Switzerland
 List of rack railways
 List of Swiss rack railways

References

External links 

Video of ascent of the line from YouTube

Metre gauge railways in Switzerland
Rack railways in Switzerland
Railway lines in Switzerland
Transport in Zürich
Railway lines opened in 1895
600 V DC railway electrification